The One Australia Movement was a minor Australian political party that was active from 1986 to 1992. It was formally registered on 3 October 1986, having been founded earlier that year by Uniting Church minister Cedric Jacobs. The party's policies included support for the monarchy, a biblical system of morality, immigration reform and social security reform, and opposition to union strike movements. After unsuccessfully contesting the 1987 federal election, running for the Senate in Western Australia, the party did not contest the 1990 federal election and was deregistered due to lack of members on 21 October 1992.

See also
 Christian politics in Australia

References

Christian political parties in Australia
Christian democratic parties in Oceania
Christian political parties
Defunct political parties in Australia
Political parties established in 1986
Political parties disestablished in 1992
1986 establishments in Australia